Simon Lunceford (died c. 1390), of Rye, Sussex and New Romney, Kent, was an English politician.

He was a Member (MP) of the Parliament of England for Rye in 1381 and for New Romney in 1386.

References

Year of birth missing
1390 deaths
English MPs 1381
People from Rye, East Sussex
People from New Romney
English MPs 1386